The Outlaw and His Wife is a 1918 Swedish silent film directed by Victor Sjöström, based on a play from 1911 by Jóhann Sigurjónsson. It tells the story of Eyvind of the Hills, an 18th-century Icelandic outlaw.

The film was groundbreaking for its portrayal of wild nature. It was shot in two sessions in the spring and late summer 1917, with Åre and Abisko in northern Sweden acting as the highlands of Iceland.

Plot
A stranger who calls himself Kári comes to a farm in the north country. He hires on as a laborer, and the widowed farm owner Halla becomes infatuated with him. The local bailiff, who wants to marry Halla, becomes jealous of Kári. Another man tells the bailiff that Kári is in fact a thief and fugitive escapee named Eyvind. Kári at first denies being Eyvind and then defeats the bailiff in a wrestling contest as a measure of his sincerity. However, when Halla proposes marriage, he confesses the truth of what happened in his earlier impoverished life as Eyvind.

When the bailiff returns with others to arrest Eyvind, he and Halla abandon the farm for the bare, cold highlands, where they live for many happy years. They have a baby girl and are accompanied by their friend Arnes.

However, around when the girl is three, Arnes confesses his loneliness and love for Halla. Halla does not share his feelings, and he decides to leave them. As he is walking away, he sees a group of men approaching and runs back to warn Eyvind and Halla. The men arrive at the same time, and a fight ensues. In fear of capture, Halla throws her child off the cliff into the river below.

Eyvind and Halla escape into the hostile winter. Some time later, they are holed up in a small cabin with no food. They are crazed with hunger. Eyvind considers abandoning Halla but does not. When Eyvind goes for firewood, Halla wanders out of the cabin and freezes in the snow. Eyvind finds her and holds her until he has died, frozen by her side.

Cast
 Victor Sjöström as Eyvind of the Hills
 Edith Erastoff as Halla
 John Ekman as Arnes
 Jenny Tschernichin-Larsson as Guðfinna
 Artur Rolén as Farmhand
 Nils Ahrén as Björn Bergstéinsson
 William Larsson as Bjarni Sveinbjörnsson

References

External links
 
 
 

1910s historical drama films
1918 films
1918 drama films
Fictional married couples
Films directed by Victor Sjöström
Films set in Iceland
Films set in the 18th century
Swedish silent films
Swedish historical drama films
Swedish black-and-white films
Swedish films based on plays
Silent historical drama films
1910s Swedish-language films